The Graffiti on the Train Tour was a worldwide concert tour by rock band Stereophonics. The band have played at festivals as well as their own shows while on the tour. It was the band's first tour without drummer Javier Weyler, who was replaced by Jamie Morrison. The tour started in Newport, Wales on 15 December 2012 and is set to end in London, England on 28 November 2013. During their leg in Japan, lead singer Kelly Jones twisted his ankle after a night out with Morrison. With their flight due to leave within a few hours and Jones unable to walk, bassist Richard Jones had to transport the singer across the airport in a luggage trolley. For the next gigs, Jones had to wear a leg strap which restricted his movement on stage. Later on while on the Australian leg, he also suffered from a respiratory tract infection which forced the band to cancel their show in Melbourne on 23 July, Stereophonics' first cancellation in 17 years. Before their American leg of the tour, a competition was held by Creative Allies for people to design a poster for the leg. The winner, Yiotu, won $500 and a Stereophonics prize pack. During the last leg of the tour, The Wind and The Wave supported the band from 7–16 November. For the remaining dates, Kitty, Daisy & Lewis were the band.

Set list
This set list is representative of the performance on 20 September 2013. It does not represent all concerts for the duration of the tour.

Catacomb
Local Boy in the Photograph
Superman
Graffiti on the Train
We Share the Same Sun
Indian Summer
Have a Nice Day
Vegas Two Times
Mr. Writer
Nothing Precious at All
Maybe Tomorrow
The Bartender and the Thief
Roll the Dice
Violins and Tambourines
Been Caught Cheating
Beerbottle
Could You Be the One?
In a Moment
Encore
Billy Davey's Daughter
Just Looking
A Thousand Trees
Dakota

Tour dates

References

2012 concert tours
2013 concert tours
Stereophonics